Ice City Boyz, often abbreviated as ICB, also known as CSB (Crime Scene Boyz) and CRS (Church Road Soldiers), is a British hip hop collective from Church End, London.

History
The rap collective has been around since the early 2000s and started making music towards the start of the decade. Most members of the group come from the Church End Estate. The most successful artist from the group consists of Nines. Other artists in the group include Likkle T, Skrapz, J Styles, Fatz, Big Keyz, Streetz and others.

Trapster Toxic released the single "Life I Live" in November 2015. J Stylez, Fatz and Streetz released the single "Statement" in April 2017.

Members
The list below includes confirmed members of Ice City Boyz

 Chappo CSB
 Fatz
 J Styles
 Big Keyz
 Likkle T
 Nines
 Q2T
 Sav
 Screama
 Skrapz 
 Streetz 
 Trapstar Toxic (or simply Toxic)

Legal issues

Trapstar Toxic jailed
Trapstar Toxic was caught out, which revealed him selling drugs. It was reported to the police This led to a raid in his home in Willesden in April 2018, when police found £30,000 of drugs. They described the scene as a "drugs preparation factory" and also seized £13,000 in cash. Toxic pleaded guilty to the offences June 27, 2018, and was jailed for five years at Harrow Crown Court on 1 March 2019.

Discography

References

English hip hop groups
Hip hop collectives
Musical groups from the London Borough of Brent
Underground hip hop groups
Musical groups established in 2009
UK drill musicians